Symbolia is a genus of fly in the family Dolichopodidae.

Species
Symbolia aldrichi Robinson, 1966
Symbolia costaricensis Robinson, 1966
Symbolia hirticauda Robinson, 1966
Symbolia latifacies Robinson, 1966
Symbolia linearis (Aldrich, 1896)
Symbolia loewi (Aldrich, 1901)
Symbolia longihirta (Van Duzee, 1930)
Symbolia lugubris Parent, 1934
Symbolia maculata Robinson, 1966
Symbolia mexicana Robinson, 1966
Symbolia nigripennis (Van Duzee, 1931)
Symbolia ochracea Becker, 1922
Symbolia schildi Robinson, 1966
Symbolia setifera Robinson, 1966
Symbolia sinuata (Aldrich, 1896)
Symbolia sinuosa (Parent, 1931)

References

Diaphorinae
Dolichopodidae genera
Taxa named by Theodor Becker